Agapanthia probsti is a species of beetle in the family Cerambycidae. It was described by Holzschuh in 1984.

References

probsti
Beetles described in 1984